Frank Stringfellow Quinn, III (born 1946) is an American mathematician and professor of mathematics at Virginia Polytechnic Institute and State University, specializing in geometric topology.

Contributions

He contributed to the mathematical field of 4-manifolds, including a proof of the 4-dimensional annulus theorem. In surgery theory, he made several important contributions: the invention of the assembly map, that enables a functorial description of surgery in the topological category, with his thesis advisor, William Browder, the development of an early surgery theory for stratified spaces, and perhaps most importantly, he pioneered the use of controlled methods in geometric topology and in algebra.  Among his important applications of "control" are his aforementioned proof of the 4-dimensional annulus theorem, his development of a flexible category of stratified spaces, and, in combination with work of Robert D. Edwards, a useful characterization of high-dimensional manifolds among homology manifolds.

In addition to his work in mathematical research, he has written articles on the nature and history of mathematics and on issues of mathematical education.

Awards and honors
In 2012 he became a fellow of the American Mathematical Society.

Selected publications
Frank Quinn, Ends of maps. I. Annals of Mathematics (2) 110 (1979), no. 2, 275–331.
Frank Quinn, Ends of maps. II. Inventiones Mathematicae 68 (1982), no. 3, 353–424.
Frank Quinn, Ends of maps. III. Dimensions 4 and 5.  Journal of Differential Geometry 17 (1982), no. 3, 503–521.
Michael Freedman and Frank Quinn, Topology of 4-manifolds. Princeton Mathematical Series, 39. Princeton University Press, Princeton, NJ, 1990. viii+259 pp. 
Vyacheslav S. Krushkal and Frank Quinn, Subexponential groups in 4-manifold topology.  Geometry and Topology 4 (2000), 407–430.

References

External links
 Home page
 Theoretical Mathematics by Arthur Jaffe and Frank Quinn
 AMS K-12 education Working Group

Frank Quinn papers at Microsoft Academic
Prospects in Topology (AM-138), Volume 138: Proceedings of a Conference in Honor of William Browder. (AM-138)

20th-century American mathematicians
21st-century American mathematicians
Topologists
Princeton University alumni
Virginia Tech faculty
Fellows of the American Mathematical Society
1946 births
Living people